Cedarville is an unincorporated community in North Coventry Township in Chester County, Pennsylvania, United States. Originally called Stumptown, in 1878 the Postal Service changed the name of the local post office to Cedarville due to its location in a cedar forest.

References

Unincorporated communities in Chester County, Pennsylvania
Unincorporated communities in Pennsylvania